Hand It Over is the seventh studio album by alternative rock band Dinosaur Jr., released on March 25, 1997, on Reprise Records. It peaked at #188 in the United States. According to a 2007 Magnet interview with band leader J Mascis, Hand It Over is his favorite album from the group's major label period of the 1990s.

The band enjoyed a somewhat renewed appreciation from critics on Hand It Over. However, in the years following the band's hiatus, Hand It Over would become hard to find due to it not having the initial strong sales of Where You Been and Without a Sound which both sported moderate radio hits. Hand It Over sold 34,000 units in US.

Track listing
All songs written by J Mascis.

Personnel
 J Mascis – lead vocals, guitars, drums, percussion, keyboards, production
 Mike Johnson – bass
 Maura Jasper – artwork
 John Yates – sound engineer
 Andy Wilkinson – sound engineer
 Brian Paulson – sound engineer
 Dan McLoughlin – sound engineer
 Greg Calbi – mastering
 John Agnello – mixing
 Brian Sperber – mixing (assistant)
 Philip Reichenheim (Inlay Photographs) – photography
 Kevin Shields – record producer, vocals (track 1, 2)
 Bilinda Butcher – vocals (track 1)
 Tiffany Anders – vocals (track 2, 4)
 Varsh Farazdel – vocals (track 10)
 Kurt Fedora – bass (track 6)
 Dan Mclughlin – keyboards (track 7)
 George Berz – drums, percussion (track 10)
 Donna Gauger – trumpet 
 Recorded at Bob's Place, Bearsville Barn and MBV Studio.
 Mixed at Electric Lady Studios
 Mastered at Masterdisk

References

1997 albums
Dinosaur Jr. albums
Blanco y Negro Records albums
Reprise Records albums